IFT140, Intraflagellar transport 140 homolog, is a protein that in humans is encoded by the IFT140 gene. The gene product forms a core component of IFT-A complex which is indipensible for retrograde intraflagellar transport within the primary cilium.

Clinical significance 

Mutations in this gene have been associated to cases of skeletal ciliopathy called Mainzer Saldino Syndrome, characterised by skeletal developmental anomalies, retinal degeneration and a fibrocystic renal disease known as nephronophthisis. It has also been described in patients with Jeune Syndrome and isolated Lebers congenital amaurosis in the absence of other syndromic features.

Model organisms 

Model organisms have been used in the study of IFT140 function. A conditional knockout mouse line called Ift140tm1a(KOMP)Wtsi was generated at the Wellcome Trust Sanger Institute. Male and female animals underwent a standardized phenotypic screen to determine the effects of deletion. Additional screens performed:  - In-depth immunological phenotyping

An ENU derived mouse (cauli) carrying homozygous IFT140 alleles (c.2564T>A, p. I855K) was generated at the Murdoch Children's Research Institute in Melbourne, Australia. The cauli mouse presented with mid-gestational lethality, exencephaly, spina bifida, craniofacial dysmorphism, digital anomalies, cardiac anomalies and somite patterning defects. Ectopic hedgehog signalling was demonstrated by wholemount in situ hybridisation in the limb buds and abnormal morphology of the primary cilium within the limb bud was demonstrated by scanning electron microscopy.

A patient with Mainzer Saldino Syndrome carrying compound heterozygous variants in IFT140 had induced pluripotent stem cells reprogrammed and CRISPR gene corrected before differentiating both stem cell lines into kidney organoids for transcriptional comparison. Aside from validating the club shaped morphology of the primary cilia seen in the cauli mouse limb bud within the regenerated nephron tubules of the IFT140c.634G>A/c.2176C>G organoids compared to the IFT140WT/c.2176C>G, bulk RNA sequencing comparison demonstrated significant differences in gene pathways related to apicobasal polarity, cell-cell junctions and axonemal dynein assembly.

References